Miikka Oinonen (born 26 May 1983) is a Finnish footballer who plays for Ristiinan Pallo as a striker.

Club career 
Miikka Oinonen was youth-trained at Mikkelin Palloilijat.  While playing for MP in the Ykkönen in 2004, he scored 14 goals, and was the league's top scorer.  This attracted attention from larger clubs, and he joined Turun Palloseura in 2005, allowing him to play in Veikkausliiga for the first time.  He found little success with TPS and after only a few months he transferred to another Veikkausliiga club in July 2005, Kuopion Palloseura.

With KuPS, he played in the Veikkausliiga for one and a half seasons, appearing in 33 league matches and scoring nine goals.  In 2006, Miikka won the Finnish League Cup, scoring both goals in the final against FC KooTeePee and was named the player of the match.  The six league goals he scored in the 2006 Veikkausliiga season led the team.  However, KuPS was relegated at the end of the season, and nearly went bankrupt.  Back in the Ykkönen, Oinonen scored 3 goals in 24 games as KuPS was promoted back to the Veikkausliiga.  However, Oinonen would return to MP following the season.

In 2017, Miikka returned to MP and scored 17 goals in 24 matches across the next two seasons, after which he decided to retire.  However, by March of the following season, he decided to continue playing, but at a lower level with Ristiinan Pallo in the Kolmonen.  After scoring 19 goals in 10 games with Ristiinan, MP decided to bring Oinonen back for one more season, and Oinonen helped MP get promoted from the Kakkonen to the Ykkönen.  He then returned to Ristiinan, where he continues to play.

References

External links 

1983 births
Living people
Finnish footballers
Kuopion Palloseura players
Turun Palloseura footballers
Kakkonen players
Veikkausliiga players
Association football forwards
People from Mikkeli
Mikkelin Kissat players
Sportspeople from South Savo